Algeria competed at the 2020 Summer Olympics in Tokyo. Originally scheduled to take place in the summer of 2020, the Games were postponed to 23 July to 8 August 2021, because of the COVID-19 pandemic. Since the nation's debut in 1964, Algerian athletes have appeared in every edition of the Summer Olympic Games, with the exception of the 1976 Summer Olympics in Montreal because of the African boycott. Unlike Algeria's previous successes in the Summer Olympics, it has failed to secure its single medal as a result of their poor, athletic performance.

Competitors
The following is the list of number of competitors in the Games.

Athletics
 
Algerian athletes achieved the entry standards, either by qualifying time or by world ranking, in the following track and field events (up to a maximum of 3 athletes in each event):

Track & road events

Field events

Boxing

Algeria entered eight boxers (five men and three women) into the Olympic tournament. Mohamed Flissi (men's flyweight), Chouaib Bouloudinat (men's super heavyweight), and three-time Olympian Abdelhafid Benchabla (men's heavyweight), along with four rookies (Nemouchi, Houmri, Boualam, and Khelif), secured their spots by advancing to the final match of their respective weight divisions at the 2020 African Qualification Tournament in Diamniadio, Senegal. Ichrak Chaib completed the nation's boxing lineup by topping the list of eligible boxers from Africa in the women's middleweight division of the IOC's Boxing Task Force Rankings.

Men

Women

Canoeing

Sprint
Algeria qualified a single boat (women's K-1 200 m) for the Games by receiving a spare berth freed up by South Africa at the 2019 African Games in Rabat, Morocco, marking the country's Olympic debut in this sporting discipline.

Qualification Legend: FA = Qualify to final (medal); FB = Qualify to final B (non-medal)

Cycling

Road
Algeria entered two riders to compete in the men's Olympic road race, by virtue of their top 50 national finish (for men) in the UCI World Ranking.

Fencing

Algeria entered four fencers into the Olympic competition. Salim Heroui (men's foil), Akram Bounabi (men's sabre), Meriem Mebarki (women's foil), and Kaouther Mohamed Belkebir secured places on the Algerian team with a top finish in their respective individual events at the African Zonal Qualifier in Cairo, Egypt.

Judo
 
Algeria qualified two judoka (one per gender) for each of the following weight classes at the Games. Fethi Nourine (men's lightweight, 73 kg) accepted a continental berth from Africa as the nation's top-ranked judoka outside of direct qualifying position based on the IJF World Ranking List of June 28, 2021, with two-time Olympian Sonia Asselah (women's heavyweight, +78 kg) receiving an additional slot to the nation's roster as the next highest-ranked judoka vying for qualification in her assigned weight category.

Fethi Nourine withdrew, saying it was to avoid the prospect of possibly facing an Israeli judoka. If he had won against Mohamed Abdalarasool of Sudan in the round of 64, he would have faced Israeli judoka Tohar Butbul, who was ranked # 5 in the tournament. Nourine withdrew to support Palestine in the Israeli–Palestinian conflict. In response, the International Judo Federation immediately suspended both Nourine and his coach Amar Benikhlef, and sent them back from Tokyo to Algeria. The Federation explained: "According to the IJF rules, in line with the Olympic Charter and especially with rule 50.2 that provides for the protection of the neutrality of sport at the Olympic Games and the neutrality of the Games themselves, which states that 'no kind of demonstration or political, religious or racial propaganda is permitted in any Olympic sites, venues or other areas,' Fethi Nourine and Amar Benikhlef are now suspended and will face a decision by the IJF Disciplinary Commission, as well as disciplinary sanctions by the National Olympic Committee of Algeria back in their country.'" It continued: "Judo sport is based on a strong moral code, including respect and friendship, to foster solidarity and we will not tolerate any discrimination, as it goes against the core values and principles of our sport." The Federation Disciplinary Commission will handle final sanctioning beyond the Olympics.

Karate
 
Algeria entered one karateka into the inaugural Olympic tournament. Lamya Matoub secured a place in the women's kumite +61-kg category, as the highest-ranked karateka vying for qualification from the African zone based on the WKD Olympic Rankings.

Rowing

Algeria qualified one boat in the men's lightweight double sculls for the Games by winning the gold medal and securing an outright berth at the 2019 FISA African Olympic Qualification Regatta in Tunis, Tunisia.

Qualification Legend: FA=Final A (medal); FB=Final B (non-medal); FC=Final C (non-medal); FD=Final D (non-medal); FE=Final E (non-medal); FF=Final F (non-medal); SA/B=Semifinals A/B; SC/D=Semifinals C/D; SE/F=Semifinals E/F; QF=Quarterfinals; R=Repechage

Sailing

Algerian sailors qualified one boat in each of the following classes through the class-associated World Championships and the continental regattas.

M = Medal race; EL = Eliminated – did not advance into the medal race

Shooting

Algeria received an invitation from ISSF to send a shooter in the women's 10 m air rifle to the Olympics, following the disqualification of Egypt's Shimaa Hashad from the 2019 African Championships over a doping offense. The athlete named to the team must have obtained a minimum qualifying score (MQS) by 31 May 2020

Swimming

Algerian swimmers further achieved qualifying standards in the following events (up to a maximum of 2 swimmers in each event at the Olympic Qualifying Time (OQT), and potentially 1 at the Olympic Selection Time (OST)):

Table tennis
 
Algeria entered one athlete into the table tennis competition at the Games. Larbi Bouriah scored a semifinal victory to occupy one of the four available spots in the men's singles at the 2020 African Olympic Qualification Tournament in Tunis, Tunisia.

Weightlifting

Algeria entered one male weightlifter into the Olympic competition. Two-time Olympian Walid Bidani topped the list of weightlifters from Africa in the men's +109 kg category based on the IWF Absolute Continental Rankings.

Wrestling

Algeria qualified eight wrestlers for each of the following classes into the Olympic competition; all of whom advanced to the top two finals to book Olympic spots in the men's freestyle (57, 86, 97, and 125 kg) and men's Greco-Roman wrestling (60, 67, 87, and 97 kg) at the 2021 African & Oceania Qualification Tournament in Hammamet, Tunisia.

Freestyle

Greco-Roman

References

External links
 Algeria at the 2020 Summer Olympics at Olympedia

Nations at the 2020 Summer Olympics
2020
2021 in Algerian sport